Capel Betws Lleucu is a hamlet in Cardiganshire, Wales.

SY postcode area SY 25 6
SN606583

References

External links
 http://www.accuweather.com/en/gb/capel-betws-lleucu/sy25-6/weather-radar/716033

Cardiganshire